Generał (pronounced ) is the generic Polish language term for the rank of general. In narrow sense it is used to denote the rank of a four-star general introduced on August 15, 2002 (formerly generał armii - general of the army). It is currently the highest military rank of the Polish Army, with the rank of Marshal of Poland currently being unused. The symbols of the rank are the wężyk generalski (pronounced ), or "general's wavy line", and four stars, featured both on the rogatywka, sleeves of the uniform and above the breast pocket of a field uniform.

Background
In Polish military traditions the highest rank was always the rank of Marshal of Poland, with three General's grades below. However, the system differed significantly from other systems of rank insignia used in both armies of the Warsaw Pact and the NATO. Because of lack of the rank of four-star general, the Polish ranks were usually a grade higher than their name suggested. Thus the rank of Generał brygady was an equivalent of Major General rather than Brigadier General as the name suggested. 

In 1954, during the integration of the Polish Army with the structures of the Warsaw Pact (and, more precisely, of the Red Army), a new rank of generał armii (General of an Army) was introduced, as a direct copy of the Soviet rank of General of the Army. However, after the death of Joseph Stalin and the end of Stalinism in Poland, the general officers rank structure returned to the pre-war pattern. In 1981 Gen. Wojciech Jaruzelski (being at this time the 1st Secretary of the Polish United Workers' Party, the Prime Minister and the Minister of the National Defense) introduced again the rank of general of the army. As the only person to hold the newly introduced rank, he was thought of as an ersatz-Marshal, as he could not promote himself to the rank of Marshal of Poland after the death of Marian Spychalski. In 1995 the rank was yet again abolished and the only people to still hold it are Jaruzelski and Gen. Florian Siwicki, both died in the early 2010s. 

However, with Poland's entry into the structures of NATO a need arose to unify the Polish rank system with that of English-speaking countries (and more precisely, the US). Hence the rank of a Generał was introduced. The rank of Marshal of Poland remains as the "wartime" rank, given to the chief of general staff in case of war or a successful military commander after a victorious campaign.

References

Military ranks of Poland
Polish generals

pl:Generał